Juan Cotumba Coa (born January 21, 1980 in Potosí) is a Bolivian road bicycle racer, who currently rides for UCI Continental team . He is the winner of the 2011 Vuelta a Bolivia and 2014 Vuelta al Sur de Bolivia races.

Doping
On 17 August 2014 Cotumba gave an adverse analytical finding for Furosemide and was subsequently banned for one year until 16 August 2015.

Major results

2005
 3rd Overall Doble Sucre Potosí GP Cemento Fancesa
2006
 8th Overall Doble Sucre Potosí GP Cemento Fancesa
2009
 3rd Overall Vuelta a Bolivia
1st Stage 5
 4th Overall Doble Sucre Potosí GP Cemento Fancesa
2010
 8th Overall Doble Sucre Potosí GP Cemento Fancesa
2011
 1st  Overall Vuelta a Bolivia
1st Mountains classification
1st Stages 5 & 6
2012
 8th Overall Vuelta a Bolivia
1st Stage 8
2013
 2nd Road race, National Road Championships
 5th Overall Vuelta a Bolivia
 6th Overall Vuelta al Sur de Bolivia
2014
1st Overall Vuelta al Sur de Bolivia
 2nd Road race, National Road Championships

References

External links

Bolivian male cyclists
Living people
People from Potosí
Doping cases in cycling
Bolivian sportspeople in doping cases
1980 births